5 Idiots is a 2011 Indian Kannada language comedy film directed by Master Anand making his debut in direction. Besides Anand, the film stars Vasu, Naveen Krishna, Petrol Prasanna, Harshika Poonacha and Namratha Hegde in the lead roles. It is a remake of  Hindi film Darwaaza Bandh Rakho (2006) starring Aftab Shivdasani, Isha Sharvani and Manisha Koirala.

The film released on 18 February 2011 across Karnataka. Upon release, the film generally met with average reviews from the critics and audience.

Cast 
 Master Anand
 Naveen Krishna
 Petrol Prasanna
 Vasu
 Harshika Poonacha
 Namratha Hegde
 Navyashree
 Karibasavaiah 
 Mimicry Dayanand
 Tennis Krishna
 Bank Janardhan
 Chidanand

Soundtrack 

Drums Deva has composed totally 3 songs out of which "Ringa Ringa" is copied from Telugu film, Aarya 2 and "Jingichaka" is from Pournami and "Suvarna Suvarna" is also copied from Girl Friend.

Reception

Critical response 

A critic from Bangalore Mirror wrote  "A case in point is the ‘talking God’ in the first few scenes — totally disconnected to the rest of the film. His first film as a director is just as raw as his tele-serials. He should remember that the roles that made him a child-star in films of the last century were made of sterner stuff". Sunayana Suresh from DNA wrote " Vasu, Naveen Krishna, Master Anand, Petrol Prasanna and Namrata — hatching a kidnap plan for quick money, a take on many gangster flicks like Kaante and Plan. The story then revolves around a series of misadventures that happen in one house". A critic from Sify.com wrote "Except for seasoned performers like Naveen Krishna and Harshitha Poonacha, all the other artistes either overacted or did not perform well. '5 Idiots' is eminently watchable if you can laugh at even illogical and poorly-written lengthier sequences".

References 

2011 films
2010s Kannada-language films
Indian black comedy films
2011 black comedy films
Kannada remakes of Hindi films
2011 directorial debut films